Aureoboletus auriporus, is a species of bolete fungus in the family Boletaceae that is found in Europe and North America. It was originally described in 1872 by American mycologist Charles Horton Peck, who called it Boletus auriporus. Zdenek Pouzar transferred it to the genus Aureoboletus in 1957.

The species is edible, and could be confused with (the also edible) Xerocomus illudens.

See also
List of North American boletes

References

External links

auriporus
Edible fungi
Fungi described in 1872
Fungi of Europe
Fungi of North America
Taxa named by Charles Horton Peck